Aaronsohnia pubescens is a member of the daisy family and is found across North Africa and the Arabian Peninsula including Algeria, Libya, Morocco, Saudi Arabia, Tunisia and Western Sahara.

References

Anthemideae